Colias nastes, the Labrador sulphur, is a butterfly in the family Pieridae. In Europe, it is found in the north of Norway and Sweden and on rare occasions in northern Finland. It is also found in North America, specifically in Alaska, Canada, and the Rocky Mountains, Washington, Montana and on Greenland. In Asia, it is found in the Altai Mountains, the border regions of Russia, China, Mongolia, Kazakhstan, the Sayan Mountains, the north of Siberia, and in the Chukotka Autonomous Okrug.

Description
The wingspan is 31–45 mm. C. nastes is dark grey green with grey-black margins and red fringes. The female is more yellowish and has more distinct yellowish submarginal spots on both wings. The under surface of the forewing is impure whitish, with greenish-yellow scales, the rose-red fringes are conspicuous, the hindwing is yellowish green, lighter at the margin, the white median spot is bordered with red and distally to it is placed a diffuse red spot, the rose-red fringes are broader than on the forewing. The female has a somewhat lighter under surface and on the forewing some small black submarginal spots.

Biology
The butterfly flies from May to August depending on the location.

The larvae feed on Astragalus species, especially A. alpinus and A. frigidus. In North America it is also recorded on Trifolium repens and possibly Vaccinium species.

Subspecies
C. n. nastes Altai, Sayan, Chukot Peninsula, Alaska, Greenland, Labrador, Greenland.
C. n. aliaska O. Bang-Haas, 1927 Alaska, Canada (Yukon, Northwest Territories, Victoria Island, Banks Island)
C. n. dezhnevi Korshunov, 1996 NE.Siberia (Magadan, Chukotka, Bilibino)
C. n. dioni Verhulst, 1999 Canada (Alberta)
C. n. jakutica Kurentzov, 1970 Russian Far East (Yakutia)
C. n. moina Strecker, 1880 Canada (Northwest Territories, Manitoba)
C. n. streckeri Grum-Grshimailo, 1895 Canada (Alberta, British Columbia), N.Washington, Montana
C. n. zemblica Verity, 1911 Novaja Zemlja
C. n. cocandicides Verity, 1911
C. n. ferrisi Verhulst, 2004 Alaska
C. n. mongola Alpheraky, 1897

References
Churkin, S., Grieshuber, J ., Bogdanov, P. & Zamolodchikov, D., 2001 Taxonomic notes on Colias tyche Böber, 1812 and Colias nastes Boisduval, 1832 (Lepidoptera, Pieridae) from the Russian Far East with the descriptions of new subspecies. Helios 2: 103–116, pls.8-10.
Joseph T. Verhulst (English translation R. Leestmans, editing E. Benton and R. Leestmans), 2000 Les Colias du Globe translation Monograph of the genus Colias Keltern, Germany : Goecke & Evers

External links
Butterflies of Europe
Butterflies and Moths of North America
Russian insects
Butterflies of Canada
 Colias nastes images at  Consortium for the Barcode of Life 
State Darwin Museum images type specimen images of  C. nastes magadanica Churkin, Greishuber, Bogdanov et Zamolodchikov, 2001 and Colias nastes flinti Churkin, Greishuber, Bogdanov et Zamolodchikov, 2001 at the Darwin Museum

nastes
Butterflies of North America
Butterflies of Europe
Insects of the Arctic
Butterflies described in 1832